The BL40 is a model of South Korean electronic brand LG's brand of LG Chocolate phones. It was introduced on 3 August 2009 as part of the "New Chocolate" range. It has a  unique design, with a 4-inch display with the first in mobile phone history: a wide aspect ratio of 21:9. It features the same S-Class 3D user interface that debuted on the LG Arena.

 
It is tri-band with HSDPA support. Its camera is a 5-megapixel f/2.8 with a Schneider Kreuznach Tessar lens (as seen previously on LG Renoir, LG Viewty and others). It has 335 MB internal storage but has MicroSD expandable storage for up to 32 GB extra. There's also Wi-Fi, an accelerometer, and an FM transmitter.

References

 LG Chocolate BL40

Chocolate (BL40)
Mobile phones introduced in 2009
Mobile phones with an integrated hardware keyboard